Sericopelma is a genus of tarantula (family Theraphosidae), found in Central America from Nicaragua to Panama. The limits of the genus and its distribution have long been confused; it is closely related to the genus Aphonopelma. Sericopelma species are among the largest found in Central America. They can be kept as pets, although at least one species has been described as "very aggressive".

Description 
Spiders in the genus Sericopelma are some of the largest found in Central America. They can be kept as pets in terraria, although S. melanotarsum is described as "very aggressive".

Diagnosis 
Characters that distinguish species of the genus Sericopelma from other theraphosids found in the same localities include the following. The carapace is longer than wide, with a deep transverse pit (fovea) and distinct grooves radiating from it. The femur of the fourth leg has a dense pad of feathery (plumose) hair on the side facing away from the head of the animal (retrolateral); the metatarsus of the same leg has a divided and reduced trace of tuft-like (scopulate) hairs at the end furthest from the body. The first leg lacks stridulatory hairs. Females have spermathecae with a single lobe, expanded at the apex to form a P-shape in cross-section. Males lack tibial spurs and their palpal bulbs have an embolus of a characteristic shape.

Taxonomy 
Sericopelma was initially described by Anton Ausserer in 1875 as a subgenus of Eurypelma (now Avicularia) with the type species E. rubronitens. It was given full generic status by Simon in 1892. Until the middle of the 20th century only males were known by formal descriptions. The genus as a whole was described in 2015 as "poorly defined". Confusion with genera such as Brachypelma has been frequent; two species were transferred from that genus in 2015.

A molecular phylogenetic study in 2016 produced the cladogram shown below, showing that Sericopelma is embedded in the genus Aphonopelma, as the latter is currently circumscribed. It is likely that generic boundaries will change with further research.

Species 

, the World Spider Catalog accepted the following species:
Sericopelma angustum (Valerio, 1980) – Costa Rica
Sericopelma commune F. O. Pickard-Cambridge, 1897 – Panama
Sericopelma dota Valerio, 1980 – Costa Rica
Sericopelma embrithes (Chamberlin & Ivie, 1936) – Panama
Sericopelma ferrugineum Valerio, 1980 – Costa Rica
Sericopelma generala Valerio, 1980 – Costa Rica
Sericopelma immensum Valerio, 1980 – Costa Rica
Sericopelma melanotarsum Valerio, 1980 – Costa Rica
Sericopelma panamanum (Karsch, 1880) – Panama; may be included in S. rubronitens
Sericopelma panamense (Simon, 1891) – Panama (some sources include Mexico, but this is rejected in a 2015 study)
Sericopelma rubronitens Ausserer, 1875 – Central America (Panama)
Sericopelma silvicola Valerio, 1980 – Costa Rica
Sericopelma upala Valerio, 1980 – Costa Rica

One species has been rejected as a member of the genus Sericopelma, but no other placement has been given, so that it is still listed in this genus:

Sericopelma fallax Mello-Leitão, 1923 – Brazil

In synonymy 

 Sericopelma balboanum (Chamberlin, 1940) = Sericopelma rubronitens
 Sericopelma consocius (Chamberlin, 1940) = Sericopelma rubronitens

Nomen dubium 

 Sericopelma striatum (Ausserer, 1871) – Venezuela

Transferred to other genera 

 Sericopelma carapoense (Lucas, 1983) → Nhandu carapoensis

Distribution 
Specimens placed in the genus have been given localities ranging from Mexico to Brazil. However, detailed studies by Gabriel and Longhorn in 2011 and 2015 suggest that some of these were errors, and that the true range of the genus is from Nicaragua to Panama.

References 

Theraphosidae
Theraphosidae genera
Spiders of Central America